is the sixth studio album by Japanese idol duo Wink, released by Polystar on July 10, 1991. It features the singles "Kitto Atsui Kuchibiru (Remain)" and "Manatsu no Tremolo". Also included in the album are Japanese-language covers of The Beach Boys' "Fun, Fun, Fun", Bette Midler's "Night and Day", and Zager and Evans' "In the Year 2525".

The album peaked at No. 6 on Oricon's albums chart and sold over 108,000 copies.

Track listing 
All music is arranged by Satoshi Kadokura.

Charts

References

External links 
 
 
 

1991 albums
Wink (duo) albums
Japanese-language albums